Leroy Reams (born August 11, 1943) is a retired American professional baseball player. An outfielder, first baseman and third baseman by trade, he attended Castlemont High School in Oakland, CA and had a nine-year pro career but appeared in only one Major League game as a pinch hitter for the Philadelphia Phillies on May 7, 1969. Batting for Barry Lersch in the eighth inning of a game at Connie Mack Stadium against the Houston Astros, Reams struck out against Larry Dierker, who pitched a five-hit, 14-strikeout 6–1 victory against Reams' Phillies.

Signed originally by the New York Yankees in 1962, he was acquired by the Phils after two seasons in the Yankee system. Most of his career was spent at the Double-A level. After his one game in the big leagues, Reams spent the rest of 1969 with the Double-A Reading Phillies and Triple-A Eugene Emeralds. He retired after the 1970 season, and after playing in 954 minor league games.

References

External links
Baseball Reference.com page

1943 births
Living people
Baseball players from Arkansas
Chattanooga Lookouts players
Eugene Emeralds players
Idaho Falls Yankees players
Macon Peaches players
Montgomery Rebels players
Philadelphia Phillies players
Reading Phillies players
San Diego Padres (minor league) players
Toledo Mud Hens players
African-American baseball players